Tarrant Rawston is a hamlet and civil parish in the county of Dorset in southern England. It is named after the River Tarrant which flows through the parish. It has a small church, built of flint and stone, which is situated within the garden of the neighbouring farmhouse. Surrounding the village are many pre-historic barrows. In 2013 the civil parish had an estimated population of 40.

References

External links

Hamlets in Dorset